William Chmielewski (born December 12, 1941) is an American former professional basketball player. He was born in Detroit, Michigan and attended Holy Redeemer High School, graduating in 1960. As a senior he helped Holy Redeemer capture the Class B state basketball championship. Chmielewski then played basketball at the University of Dayton.

Career
Chmielewski, who stood 6'10", won the National Invitation Tournament in 1962 with the University of Dayton, and was named MVP of the tournament. He left college after one season to get married, and signed with the Philadelphia Tapers in the American Basketball League. In 1964, he was selected in the NBA draft by the Cincinnati Royals, but has never played in the NBA.

In 1964–1965 he played for the Muskogan Panthers. In 1966–1967 he played for the Battle Creek Braves. Both teams were in the North American Basketball League

References

1941 births
Living people
American Basketball League (1961–62) players
American men's basketball players
Basketball players from Detroit
Centers (basketball)
Cincinnati Royals draft picks
Dayton Flyers men's basketball players
Holy Redeemer High School (Detroit) alumni